The 1952 Illinois State Normal Redbirds football team represented Illinois State Normal University—now known as Illinois State University—as a member of the Interstate Intercollegiate Athletic Conference (IIAC) during the 1952 college football season. Led by eighth-year head coach Edwin Struck, the Redbirds compiled an overall record of 1–6–2 with a mark of 1–4–1 in conference play, placing sixth in the IIAC. Illinois State Normal played home games at McCormick Field in Normal, Illinois.

Sophomore quarterback Wes Bair completed 136 passes during the season, breaking the small college record for most passes completed in a single season.

Schedule

References

Illinois State Normal
Illinois State Redbirds football seasons
Illinois State Normal Redbirds football